KQBT (93.7 FM) is an urban contemporary radio station in Houston, Texas. It is owned by iHeartMedia.  The station's studios are located along the West Loop Freeway in the city's Uptown district, and the transmitter site is near Missouri City, Texas.

KQBT carries Pride Radio on the HD Radio sub-channel.

History

Early years
KQBT was initially signed on by Joel S., Donald J., and James A. Kaufman on December 13, 1963, at 18,460 watts ERP, from an elevation at 457 feet height above average terrain. The facility received a call set of KBNO. The station featured "popular music of the time and show tunes". The KBNO studios and RCA BTF 5B transmitter were located on the 34th floor of the Gulf Building, and the corner of Main and Rusk Streets in downtown Houston. KBNO received its initial License to Cover on April 7, 1964.

In 1970, the station was noted in the movie Brewster McCloud, which featured a station advertisement on the side of a passing bus.

In the Fall of 1971, the station changed formats to top 40 as KRLY, but took on various format shifts and identities throughout the decade, such as album oriented rock "Y-94", "Disco 94", then "KRLY 94", a top 40/urban hybrid. By mid-1981, the station had rebranded as "Love 94." During its time as “Disco 94,” radio/television personality turned 2018 congressional political candidate Dayna Steele was among its air staffers.

In March 1984, the station switched to adult contemporary as "Lite Rock 93.7" and changed calls to KLTR (adopted on March 20, 1984). The station rebranded to "K-Lite 93.7" in the late 1980s.

The Arrow
On November 25, 1993, at 2 p.m., the station flipped to Classic Hits, branded as "Arrow 93.7", and launched with Bob Seger's "Old Time Rock and Roll". The KKRW call letters were adopted on December 20, 1993.

Over the next decade, the station evolved to straightforward classic rock. In the early 2000s, KKRW was home of the "Dean & Rog" morning show until they left in early 2009 (currently at KGLK/KHPT).

In early 2009, the station began airing (in syndication) former KLOL morning hosts "Walton & Johnson", who host a politically-oriented morning show that leans right. The show was dropped from KKRW in December 2012 (they're now at sister station KPRC). Afternoon personality Steve Fixx filled in with a music-heavy show for several months called the "Morning Classic Rock Fixx" until the arrival of veteran St. Louis personality JC Corcoran with "JC and the Morning Showgram" in March 2013.

KKRW enjoyed ratings success for a number of years, both in Arbitron's diary and Portable People Meter ratings measurement systems. KKRW took an initial ratings hit when Dean and Rog left for KGLK, but rebounded to beat the new challenger for roughly a year and a half because of the addition of longtime Houston-based radio shock jocks Walton & Johnson, who helped make KKRW their flagship station.

The Beat
Ratings remained strong until KGLK, which played a slightly lighter classic rock format (identifying as classic hits), began simulcasting on 106.9 and 107.5 in June 2011. In its last full book with classic rock, KKRW was ranked #17 with a 2.4 share of the market according to Arbitron's Houston market ratings.

On December 31, 2013, at 10 a.m., after playing Thin Lizzy's "The Boys are Back in Town", the station began stunting with music from many genres. At Noon, after playing Journey's "Don't Stop Believin'," KKRW flipped to Urban Contemporary, branded as "93.7 The Beat." The first song on "The Beat" was "Drunk in Love" by Houston native Beyoncé. The move gives Houston a straight-ahead, core-based R&B/Hip-Hop outlet and new competition for KBXX, whose direction focuses on hit-driven R&B/Hip-Hop material, as well as KBXX's sister Urban AC KMJQ, both of which are owned by Radio One, and are usually the two dominant stations in the market.  It was the first time in 14 years iHeartMedia (then known as Clear Channel Communications) attempted an urban outlet in Houston, as it once owned KBXX and KMJQ from 1994 to 2000, when both were spun off to Radio One.

On January 15, 2014, KKRW changed call letters to KQBT to match the "Beat" moniker.

HD Radio 
On September 7, 2017, KQBT HD2 launched a new urban adult contemporary format as 104.5 Kiss FM, simulcasting on the leased translator 104.5 K283CH (which was previously fed by sister station KTBZ-FM HD2's regional Mexican format). The station primarily competes with KMJQ.

On February 18, 2019, the analog simulcast of Kiss FM ended after iHeartMedia's lease of the translator expired. The station continued to operate on KQBT as Kiss 93.7 HD2. On June 26, 2019, KQBT-HD2 flipped to iHeart's "Pride Radio" format of Top 40/Dance music targeting the LGBTQ community. This marks the second such format to air in Houston, the other being Entercom's "Channel Q" network airing on KKHH-HD2.

References

External links

QBT
Urban contemporary radio stations in the United States
Radio stations established in 1963
1963 establishments in Texas
IHeartMedia radio stations